Cinnamomum triplinerve is a tree in the genus Cinnamomum.

Description
It flowers in May and June and bears fruit in July and August.

Range
According to GBIF, Cinnamomum triplinerve can be found from the north of Mexico to the South of Brazil.

References

triplinerve
Plants described in 1961